The fourth season of Drop Dead Diva premiered on June 3, 2012 and concluded on September 9, 2012, on Lifetime. Season four aired Sundays at 9:00 pm ET and consisted of 13 episodes.

Cast

Main cast
 Brooke Elliott as Jane Bingum (13 episodes)
 Margaret Cho as Teri Lee (13 episodes)
 Jackson Hurst as Grayson Kent (13 episodes)
 Kate Levering as Kim Kaswell (13 episodes)
 April Bowlby as Stacy Barrett (13 episodes)
 Lex Medlin as Judge Owen French (11 episodes)
 Carter MacIntyre as Luke Daniels (13 episodes)
 Josh Stamberg as Jay Parker (13 episodes)

Recurring cast
 Kim Kardashian as Nikki LePree (4 episodes)
 Marcus Lyle Brown as A.D.A. Paul Saginaw (3 episodes)
 Gregory Alan Williams as Judge Warren Libby (3 episodes)

Guest cast
 Brandy Norwood as Elisa Shayne (2 episodes)
 Ben Feldman as Fred (2 episodes)
 Faith Prince as Elaine Bingum (2 episodes)
 Sharon Lawrence as Bobbie Dobkins (1 episode)
 Rhoda Griffis as Paula Dewey (1 episode)
 Vickie Eng as Judge Rita Mayson (1 episode)
 Mary Mouser as Chloe Surnow (1 episode)

Production
On September 22, 2011, Lifetime picked up the show for a 4th season featuring 13 episodes, which premiered on June 3, 2012. Lex Medlin who played the recurring role of Judge Owen French, has been upgraded to a series regular in season four. Carter MacIntyre also joined the main cast for season four. He plays the role of Luke Daniels, Jane's new guardian angel. Kim Kardashian will recur as Nikki, Stacy's business partner. Brandy is confirmed to be reprising her role as Elisa Shayne for season four.

Episodes

References

External links
 Drop Dead Diva on Lifetime
 

2012 American television seasons